Haji Tengku Rizal Nurdin (February 21, 1948 – September 5, 2005) was the 14th and 15th Governor of North Sumatra, Indonesia. He served from 1998 until his death on September 5, 2005. In that time he was serving in his second period (2003–2008). In the previous period (1998–2003), he was also the Governor of North Sumatra.

Before becoming governor, he was Bukit Barisan Territorial Military Commander I in 1997, in the rank of major general. Although born in West Sumatra, he was a Deli Malay.

He was appointed North Sumatran Governor on June 15, 1998. His second term was on March 24, 2003, and it would end on June 15, 2008.

In his marriage with Hj. NR Siti Maryam (born 1948), he has 2 daughters: T. Armilla Madiana and T. Arisma Mellina. In additional, Rizal Nurdin was also the Head of North Sumatran KONI.

On September 5, 2005. Rizal was among the 100 passenger who died in the Mandala Airlines Flight 091 crash along with his predecessor, Raja Inal Siregar who died 1 day later in the hospital from injuries. At that time he was in the official travel to present in the sudden meeting with newly Indonesian President at that time Susilo Bambang Yudhoyono in Jakarta later that night.

Education
 Elementary School – completed in Medan 1961
 Junior High School – completed in Medan 1964
 Senior High School – completed in Medan 1967
 School of Social and Political Science – completed in Jakarta 1996

Military education
 Sussarpara - in Batujajar 1969
 Land Akabri (Republic of Indonesian’s Armed Forces Academy) - in Magelang 1971
 Sussarcabif - in Bandung 1971
 Ranger/Airborne Course - in USA 1974
 Instructor Course  – in USA 1980
 Inf Mortar Training - in USA 1980
 Inf Off Advance Course – in USA 1980
 Sus Dan Yonif - in Bandung 1985
 Seskoad - in Bandung 1988

Rank history
 Second lieutenant – December 1, 1971
 First lieutenant – April 1, 1974
 Captain – April 1, 1977
 Major – October 1, 1981
 Lieutenant colonel - October 1, 1986
 Colonel - October 1, 1992
 TNI Brigadier General – February 1, 1995
 TNI Major General – August 1, 1997

Career
 Danton Brigif Linud 18 Kostrad - 1972
 Danton 3/A Yon 501 Kostrad - 1973
 Danki A Yonif 501 Kostrad - 1976
 Danyonif 321 Brigif 13 - 1985
 Dandim 0403 Rem 044 Gapo - 1988
 UN Head Representative -Untac in Laos - 1993
 Dan Secapa TNI Land Forces - 1995
 Chief of Staff of Bukit Barisan I Regional Military Command - 1996
 Commander of Bukit Barisan I Regional Military Command - 1997
 Governor of North Sumatra - 1998–2003
 Governor of North Sumatra - 2003-2008 (died in office)

1948 births
2005 deaths
Governors of North Sumatra
People from Bukittinggi
People from Medan
Indonesian people of Malay descent
Victims of aviation accidents or incidents in Indonesia
Indonesian generals
Victims of aviation accidents or incidents in 2005